

R 

R